Valentin Yuryevich Katasonov (born April 5, 1950) is a Russian scientist-economist, Doctor of Economics. He is associated with the Strategic Culture Foundation (SCF), covertly run by the Russian state, and is identified by the US State Department as a prominent source of conspiracist writing and disinformation.

Biography 
In 1972 he graduated from the Faculty of International Economic Relations of the Moscow State Institute of International Relations of the USSR Ministry of Foreign Affairs with a degree in foreign trade economist. In 1976 he defended his Ph.D. thesis  State-monopoly regulation of environmental protection in the United States. In 1976-1977 and 2001-2018 he taught at MGIMO. In 1991 he defended his doctoral dissertation  Features of the internationalization of economic life in the context of an exacerbation of the global environmental situation (political and economic aspect). 1991-1993 —  Consultant to the UN Department of International Economic and Social Problems / DIESA. 1993-1996 —  Member of the Advisory Council under the President of the European Bank for Reconstruction and Development.

Regular contributor to the conspiracy theory and disinformation website Globalresearch.ca. Active defender of one of the COVID-19 misinformation about  chipping people of Bill Gates.

References

External links 
 О председателе РЭОШ В. Ю. Катасонове

1950 births
Living people
International finance economists
Moscow State Institute of International Relations alumni
Academic staff of the Moscow State Institute of International Relations
Russian economists
Neo-Stalinists
COVID-19 conspiracy theorists
Russian conspiracy theorists
Russian columnists